Hogestown is an unincorporated community in Cumberland County, Pennsylvania, United States.

History
John Hoge and his brother William Hoge were born near Hogestown; they served in the United States House of Representatives.

Notes

Unincorporated communities in Cumberland County, Pennsylvania
Unincorporated communities in Pennsylvania